The final of the Women's 4x100m Freestyle Relay event at the European LC Championships 1997 was held on Thursday 21 August 1997 in Seville, Spain.

Results

Final

Qualifying Heats

See also
1996 Women's Olympic Games 4x100m Freestyle Relay
1997 Women's World Championships (SC) 4x100m Freestyle

References
 scmsom results
 La Gazzetta Archivio

R